"Century of humiliation" or  "hundred years of national humiliation" is a term used in China to describe the period of intervention and subjugation of the Qing dynasty and the Republic of China by Western powers and Japan from 1839 to 1949.

The term arose in 1915, in the atmosphere of rising Chinese nationalism opposing the Twenty-One Demands made by the Japanese government and their acceptance by Yuan Shikai, with the Kuomintang (Chinese Nationalist Party) and Chinese Communist Party both subsequently popularizing the characterization.

History

Chinese nationalists in the 1920s and the 1930s dated the Century of Humiliation to the mid-19th century, on the eve of the First Opium War amidst the dramatic political unraveling of Qing China that followed.

Defeats by foreign powers cited as part of the Century of Humiliation include the following:

 Western and Japanese trade in opium to China (1800s-1940s)
 Defeat in the First Opium War (1839–1842) by the British and the occupation of Hong Kong.
 The unequal treaties (in particular, Nanjing, Whampoa, Aigun, and Shimonoseki)
 Defeat in the Second Opium War (1856–1860) and the sacking and looting of the Old Summer Palace by Anglo-French forces.
 The signing of the "unequal treaties" of Aigun (1858) and Peking (1860) during the Second Opium War, which ceded Outer Manchuria to Russia.
 The partial defeat during the Sino-French War (1884-1885), which resulted in losing suzerainty over Vietnam and influence in the Indochinese Peninsula.
 The British Sikkim expedition (1888).
 Defeat in the First Sino-Japanese War (1894–1895) by Japan, which resulted in the Japanese colonization of Taiwan and suzerainty over Korea.
 The Pavlov Agreement that lead to the Russian occupation of Liaodong. (1898) 
 The Eight-Nation Alliance invasion to suppress the Boxer uprising (1899–1901) and the resulting Boxer Protocol which imposed reparations in excess of the government's annual tax revenue.
 The simultaneous Russian invasion of Manchuria (1900), which resulted in anti-Chinese pogroms and the subsequent expulsion or killing of all Qing subjects in the Sixty-Four Villages East of the River.
 The Japanese invasion of Liaodong during the Russo-Japanese War. (1905) 
 The British expedition to Tibet (1903–1904)
 The Twenty-One Demands (1915) by Japan, which would have greatly extended Japanese control of China.
 The Treaty of Versailles (1919) in which German territory in China was handed to Japan and led to the anti-imperialist May Fourth Movement.
 The Japanese invasion of Manchuria (1931–1932)
 The Soviet invasion of Xinjiang (January– April 1934)
 The Second Sino-Japanese War (1937–1945), during which numerous and widespread war crimes were committed by Japanese forces, most infamously the Nanjing Massacre and lethal human experimentation by Unit 731.

In that period, China suffered major internal fragmentation, lost almost all of the wars that it fought, and was often forced to give major concessions to the great powers in unequal treaties. In many cases, China was forced to pay large amounts of reparations, open up ports for trade, lease or cede territories (such as Outer Manchuria, parts of Northwest China and Sakhalin to the Russian Empire, Jiaozhou Bay to the German Empire, Hong Kong to the British Empire, Macau to the Portuguese Empire, Zhanjiang to France, and Taiwan and Dalian to the Empire of Japan), and make various other concessions of sovereignty to foreign "spheres of influence" after military defeats.

End of humiliation
Already during the conclusion of the Boxer Protocol in 1901, some of the Western powers believed they had acted in excess and that the Protocol was too humiliating. As a result, U.S. Secretary of State John Hay formulated the Open Door Policy, which prevented the colonial powers from directly carving up China into de jure colonies, and guaranteed universal trade access to markets in China. Intended to weaken Germany, Japan, and Russia, it was only somewhat enforced and was gradually broken by the following warlord era and Japanese interventions. The semi-contradictory nature of the Open Door policy was noted early, as although it preserved the territorial integrity of China from foreign powers, it also led to trade exploitation by the same countries. With the Root–Takahira Agreement in 1908, the U.S. and Japan upheld the Open Door Policy, but other factors (such as immigration restrictions, and the assignment of the Boxer Indemnity to a managed Boxer Indemnity Scholarship instead of being directly returned to the Qing government) led to a continuation in humiliation from the Chinese perspective. In the Republic of China mainland era, the 1922 Nine-Power Treaty was also a major attempt to reaffirm Chinese sovereignty, though it failed to check Japan's expansionism and had a limited effect on extraterritoriality. Open Door was ultimately dissolved in WWII when Japan invaded China.

Extraterritorial jurisdiction and other privileges were abandoned by the United Kingdom and the United States in 1943. During World War II, Vichy France retained control over French concessions in China but was coerced into handing them over to the collaborationist Wang Jingwei regime. The postwar Sino-French Accord of February 1946 affirmed Chinese sovereignty over the concessions.

Chiang Kai-shek declared the end of the Century of Humiliation in 1943 with the abrogation of all the unequal treaties and Mao Zedong declared its end in the aftermath of World War II, with Chiang promoting his wartime resistance to Japanese rule and China's place among the Big Four in the victorious Allies in 1945, and Mao declared it with the establishment of the People's Republic of China in 1949.

Chinese politicians and writers, however, have continued to portray later events as the true end of humiliation. Its end was declared in the repulsion of UN forces during the Korean War, the 1997 reunification with Hong Kong, the 1999 reunification with Macau, and even the hosting of the 2008 Summer Olympics in Beijing. Some Chinese nationalists claim that humiliation will not end until the People's Republic of China controls Taiwan.

In 2021, coinciding with the United States–China talks in Alaska, the Chinese government began referring to the period as 120 years of humiliation, a reference to the 1901 Boxer Protocol in which the Qing Dynasty was forced to pay large reparations to members of the Eight-Nation Alliance.

Implications
The usage of the Century of Humiliation in the Chinese Communist Party's historiography and modern Chinese nationalism, with its focus on the "sovereignty and integrity of [Chinese] territory," has been invoked in incidents such as the US bombing of the Chinese Belgrade embassy, the Hainan Island incident, and protests for Tibetan independence along the 2008 Beijing Olympics torch relay. Some analysts have pointed to its use in deflecting foreign criticism of human rights abuses in China and domestic attention from issues of corruption and bolstering its territorial claims and general economic and political rise.

Commentary and criticism

Jane E. Elliott criticized the allegation that China refused to modernize or was unable to defeat Western armies as simplistic by noting that China embarked on a massive military modernization in the late 1800s after several defeats, bought weapons from Western countries, and manufactured its own at arsenals, such as the Hanyang Arsenal during the Boxer Rebellion. In addition, Elliott questioned the claim that Chinese society was traumatized by the Western victories, as many Chinese peasants (then 90% of the population) lived outside the concessions and continued about their daily lives uninterrupted and without any feeling of "humiliation".

Historians have judged the Qing dynasty's vulnerability and weakness to foreign imperialism in the 19th century to be based mainly on its maritime naval weakness, but it achieved military success against Westerners on land. The historian Edward L. Dreyer stated, "China's nineteenth-century humiliations were strongly related to her weakness and failure at sea. At the start of the First Opium War, China had no unified navy and not a sense of how vulnerable she was to attack from the sea. British navy forces sailed and steamed wherever they wanted to go. In the Arrow War (1856–60), also known as the Second Opium War, the Chinese had no way to prevent the Anglo-French navy expedition of 1860 from sailing into the Gulf of Zhili and landing as near as possible to Beijing. Meanwhile, new but not exactly modern Chinese armies suppressed the midcentury rebellions, bluffed Russia into a peaceful settlement of disputed frontiers in Central Asia, and defeated the French forces on land in the Sino-French War (1884–85). But the defeat at sea, and the resulting threat to steamship traffic to Taiwan, forced China to conclude peace on unfavorable terms."

Similar usage
In a 2019 speech, Indian Minister of External Affairs S. Jaishankar used the term in a local context, referring to the British Empire's Company rule in India and subsequent British Raj, saying, "India had two centuries of humiliation by the West."

See also

 Anti-Japanese sentiment in China
 Anti-Western sentiment in China
 Chinese Century
 Concessions in China
 Hurting the feelings of the Chinese people
 List of Chinese treaty ports
 Revanchism
 Sick man of Asia
 Unequal treaty

References

Bibliography and further reading 

 
 

 
 
 

Propaganda in China
Republic of China (1912–1949)
19th century in China
20th century in China
Chinese nationalism
Imperialism
Victimology
Historiography of China
Extraterritorial jurisdiction